"Count On Me" is the debut and winner's single by season six winner of The Voice Australia, Judah Kelly. It was released digitally immediately after he was announced the winner on 2 July 2017, as the lead single from his debut studio album, Count On Me.

Charts
"Count On Me" debuted on the ARIA Charts at number 19 with 7,980 sales, becoming the Voice Australia's most successful winner's single in four years.

References

2017 songs
2017 debut singles
Universal Records singles